Fluellen is a name of Welsh origin originally derived from Llywelyn. It may refer to:

David Fluellen (born 1992), American football running back
Andre Fluellen (born 1985), American football defensive tackle
Fluellen, fictional character in the play Henry V by William Shakespeare

Surnames of Welsh origin
Welsh-language surnames
Anglicised Welsh-language surnames